John Cobham may refer to:

John Cobham (MP) (died 1399), MP for Kent
John Brooke alias Cobham (1535–1594), MP for Queenborough
John Cobham (archdeacon of Totnes) (1873–1960), Anglican priest
John Cobham (archdeacon of Durham) (1899–1987), Anglican priest and author
John Cobham (judge), Justice of the Common Pleas
John de Cobham, 2nd Baron Cobham (of Kent) (died 1355), English nobleman
John de Cobham, 3rd Baron Cobham (died 1408)

See also